Swargathekkal Sundaram is a 2015 Malayalam film directed by debutant Manoj Aravindakshan. The film is being produced by Shaji Thomas. It stars Sreenivasan, Lal, Joy Mathew and Mythili in the main roles. Manoj Aravindakshan was a long  time associate to Joshiy. The story and screenplay is penned by Rajesh Raghavan. The songs are composed by Rakesh Kesavan and cinematography is handled by Sameer Haq.

Cast
 Sreenivasan as Sathish
 Lal
 Joy Mathew as Lopez/Gee Varghese
 Abraham Koshy 
 Mythili as Jaya

Production
The film was produced by Shaji Thomas under the banner of Ponnu Films. This is the directorial debut of Manoj Aravindakshan who was a long time associate to Joshiy. The official trailer for the movie was released on 27 April 2015.

The songs were composed by Rakesh Kesavan while the background was handled by Deepak Dev.

Release
The movie was released in theatres on 22 May 2015.

References

External links
 Official website

2015 films
2010s Malayalam-language films